Polytechnic College of Pennsylvania was an engineering school in Philadelphia, Pennsylvania founded in 1853. It was the eighth school of engineering in the United States and the first to offer degree programs in mechanical engineering, mining engineering, and architecture.

History
Technological progress in the early nineteenth century fostered an interest in the teaching of applied science and engineering. Harvard  established the Lawrence  Scientific School in 1846,  Dartmouth began the Chandler  Scientific School in  1852 and Yale began the Sheffield Scientific School in 1846. Polytechnic College of Pennsylvania was founded by Dr. Alfred L. Kennedy, who took specific inspiration from polytechnic schools in Europe, including the Polytechnische Schule of Carlsruhe and the L'Ecole Centrale des Arts of Paris. 

Kennedy (1819-1896) studied civil and mining engineering as well as medicine, and graduated from the University of Pennsylvania in 1848.  He pursued further study in Europe, studying physiology and physiological chemistry in Paris and Leipzig, and geology and botany in Paris. He lectured on medical chemistry at the Philadelphia College of Medicine and was elected professor there in 1849.  In 1842, he started the Philadelphia School of Chemistry which became the Polytechnic in 1853 when it received its charter from Pennsylvania.  Kennedy was made President and served until near the end of his life. Financial problems forced the school to close in 1890.

The school was located at the corner of Market Street and West Penn Square in Philadelphia.

Notable alumni

 Rachel Bodley, Dean, Women's Medical College of Pennsylvania
 John Birkinbine, mining engineer
 Allen Evans, partner of the architect Frank Furness
 Louis Francine, Colonel who fought in the American Civil War in the Battle of Chancellorsville and the Battle of Gettysburg, where he was wounded and subsequently died
 Rudolph Hunter, inventor, engineer and entrepreneur
 Joseph Earlston Thropp,  United States Representative from Pennsylvania

References

Educational institutions established in 1853
Universities and colleges in Philadelphia
Defunct universities and colleges in Philadelphia
Defunct private universities and colleges in Pennsylvania
1853 establishments in Pennsylvania
1890 disestablishments in Pennsylvania
Educational institutions disestablished in 1890